Leptothrix mobilis is a bacterium from the genus Leptothrix which was isolated from freshwater sediments.

References

External links
Type strain of Leptothrix mobilis at BacDive -  the Bacterial Diversity Metadatabase

Burkholderiales